Qareh Daraq, also rendered as Qara Darreh, may refer to:
 Qareh Daraq, East Azerbaijan
 Qareh Daraq, Zanjan